Mohammed Rafi (24 December 1924 – 31 July 1980) was an Indian playback singer and widely considered to be one of the greatest and most influential singers of the Indian subcontinent. Rafi was notable for his voice, versatility and range; his songs were varied from fast peppy numbers to patriotic songs, sad numbers to highly romantic songs, qawwalis to ghazals and bhajans to classical songs. He was known for his ability to mould his voice to the persona and style of an actor, lip-syncing the song on screen in the movie. He received six Filmfare Awards and one National Film Award. In 1967, he was honoured with the Padma Shri award by the Government of India. In 2001, Rafi was honoured with the "Best Singer of the Millennium" title by Hero Honda and Stardust magazine. In 2013, Rafi was voted for the Greatest Voice in Hindi Cinema in the CNN-IBN's poll.

National Film Awards

Filmfare Awards

Bengal Film Journalists' Association Awards

Sur Singer Award

Honours
 1948 – Rafi received a silver medal from the Indian Prime Minister Jawaharlal Nehru, on the first anniversary of the Indian Independence Day.
 1967 – Honoured with the Padma Shri by the Government of India.
 2001 – Rafi was honoured with the "Best Singer of the Millennium" by Hero Honda and Stardust magazine.
 2013 – Rafi won the CNN-IBN poll for the Greatest Voice in Hindi Cinema.

References

External links
 

Rafi, Mohammed